Sikkim is a 1971 Indian documentary about the nation of Sikkim, directed by Satyajit Ray. The documentary was commissioned by the Chogyal (King) of Sikkim at a time when he felt the sovereignty of Sikkim was under threat from both China and India. Ray's documentary is about the sovereignty of Sikkim. The film was banned by the government of India, when Sikkim merged with India in 1975. In 2000, the copyright of the film was transferred to the Art and Culture Trust of Sikkim.  The ban was finally lifted by  the Ministry of External Affairs (MEA) in September 2010.  In November 2010 the director of the Kolkata film festival stated that upon screening the documentary for the first time, he received an injunction from the court of Sikkim again banning the film.

Production
Satyajit had planned several documentaries about with people in their setting in focus, like musicians of Rajasthan, dancers in Ellora, but eventually ended up making only one. Ray's cousin who lived in Darjeeling, had appeared in film, Kanchenjungha (1962) also shot in Darjeeling, was acquainted with Chogyal of Sikkim Palden Thondup Namgyal and his American wife Hope Cooke, the couple commissioned the film and his cousin convinced Ray to take on the project.

Overview
No critics have seen the film, but Ray described it in the following way: "While they're reaching this point, I cut to a shot of a piece of telegraph wire. It's raining and there are two drops of rain approaching on a downward curve. It's a very poetic seven minutes. And the end is also very lively, very optimistic, with children, happy, laughing, smoking, singing. The whole thing builds up into a paean of praise for the place." The documentary was screened for public viewing for the first time in 39 years at the 16th Kolkata Film Festival. Mathures Paul of The Statesman wrote in his review, "Sandwiched between Pratidwandi, Seemabaddha and Asani Sanket, Sikkim is beautiful, more an essay from a respected travel journal from Ray’s era accompanied by detailed photographs that graced magazines like Life".

Censorship

Revival
Except a screening for the Chogyal family, the film never got formally released. For many years, the film was considered to be lost and it was thought that the only surviving record of the film is a scene-by-scene written reconstruction of the film by the remaining film team members. However, in January 2003 it was reported that a good quality print has been kept by the British Film Institute. When the Kolkata-based Satyajit Ray Society traced a print with the Chogyal's family it was found to be damaged beyond repair, finally, a print that had made its way to London was traced and restored by the Academy Film Archive in 2007. A restored version was shown in 2008 during a "Ray Retrospective" at the Nantes Three Continents Film Festival in France.

After the government overturned the ban, the restored copy reached the Gangtok-based Art and Culture Trust of Sikkim in September 2010, which has earlier received the prints and right for the film in 2000.

Amidst a lot of controversies, this was finally screened at a film festival at Kolkata in Nandan in Nov 2010.
People waited hours and sat on the movie hall floors to watch the single screening of this movie. This was again removed after a single show, as a Sikkim court ordered a stay on the screening of this documentary.

References

External links
Satayajitray.org page
 
 Article on the restoration of the film at Satyajit Ray World

Films directed by Satyajit Ray
1971 films
History of Sikkim
Documentary films about politics
Films shot in Sikkim
Northeast Indian films
1970s English-language films